Stephan Steding (born 29 January 1982) is a German track and field athlete competing in the javelin throw. He competed in the 2008 Summer Olympics in Beijing, where he missed the final round after finishing 17th in his qualification group with 70.05 m. Steding has a personal best of 83.50 m.

Competition record

Seasonal bests by year
2002 - 78.50
2003 - 81.96
2004 - 82.13
2006 - 74.64
2007 - 82.46
2008 - 83.50
2009 - 81.28

References

1982 births
Living people
German male javelin throwers
Athletes (track and field) at the 2008 Summer Olympics
Olympic athletes of Germany
People from Rinteln
Sportspeople from Lower Saxony